Michael “Tunes” Antunes (born August 10, 1940) is a professional American saxophonist.  He is most noted for playing the tenor saxophone on hit songs with John Cafferty and the Beaver Brown Band and for his acting role as the saxophonist in the 1983 movie Eddie and the Cruisers and its sequel, Eddie and the Cruisers II: Eddie Lives!

Early life

Antunes is a second-generation American with a Cape Verde heritage who was born into a musical family in New Bedford, Massachusetts.  Antunes’ father Peter Antunes played upright bass, guitar and Hammond organ, performing throughout New England.  Antunes began performing at age 13 while still attending Dartmouth High School, and most of his early shows were playing Cape Verde music with his guitarist brother David and a cousin in a band called Second Generation.
Throughout the 1960s, Antunes performed in New England and upstate New York as a saxophone player in the Blazers, Bernie and the Cavaliers, the New Spices, Mike n’ Jenna, and Triumph.  While with the Blazers, he recorded the songs "Grasshopper" with Mundo records (#864), and "A-Time" (#2002) and a remake of the Li’l Ray Armstrong song, "Boom Boom" (#2001) on Empire Records.

Mainstream success

In the 1970s Antunes joined John Cafferty & The Beaver Brown Band, which was an American rock band from Rhode Island. The band's soundtrack album for the movie, Eddie and the Cruisers reached the top 10 on the Billboard 200 chart and produced a number 7 hit single, "On the Dark Side" on the Billboard Hot 100.  Antunes performed in the movie as the band's saxophone player and also in the movie's sequel.  In 2016, Rolling Stone ranked the fictional Eddie and the Cruisers at #18 in their list of 25 Greatest Movie Bands. "On the Dark Side" held number-one on the Album Rock Tracks chart for five weeks. The album was eventually certified triple Platinum by the RIAA.

In addition to playing with John Cafferty & The Beaver Brown Band, from 2004 to 2011, Antunes played with Ernie and the Automatics, a blues band that included former members of Boston, The J. Geils Band, and Peter Wolf’s band.

Personal
Antunes has 11 children with his wife Jennifer, two of whom are involved in the music industry: sons Kevin (the musical director for Madonna) and Matthew (the musical director for Tavares, who had a number of R&B hits in the 1970s, some with a Cape Verde influence).

References

External links
 John Cafferty and the Beaver Brown Band
 
 

1940 births
Living people
American saxophonists
American musicians of Cape Verdean descent
People from New Bedford, Massachusetts